The 1991 NCAA Division I-AA Football Championship Game was a postseason college football game between the Youngstown State Penguins and the Marshall Thundering Herd. The game was played on December 21, 1991, at Paulson Stadium in Statesboro, Georgia. The culminating game of the 1991 NCAA Division I-AA football season, it was won by Youngstown State, 25–17.

Teams
The participants of the Championship Game were the finalists of the 1991 I-AA Playoffs, which began with a 16-team bracket. The location of the final, the Georgia Southern Eagles' Paulson Stadium, had been predetermined via a three-year agreement the university reached with the NCAA in February 1989.

Youngstown State Penguins

Youngstown State finished their regular season with an 8–3 record. Unseeded in the tournament and ranked 13th in the final NCAA I-AA in-house poll, the Penguins defeated Villanova, top-seed Nevada, and Samford to reach the final. This was the first appearance for Youngstown State in a Division I-AA championship game.

Marshall Thundering Herd

Marshall also finished their regular season with an 8–3 record (5–2 in conference). Unseeded and ranked eighth in the final NCAA I-AA in-house poll, the Thundering Herd defeated Western Illinois, third-seed Northern Iowa, and second-seed Eastern Kentucky to reach the final. This was the second appearance for Marshall in a Division I-AA championship game, having lost in 1987.

Game summary
After a low-scoring first half, Youngstown State held a 3–0 lead at halftime. Marshall then scored all of their points in the third quarter, taking a 17–6 lead. Youngstown State rallied for three touchdowns in the fourth quarter, and a 25–17 win.

Scoring summary

Game statistics

References

Further reading

External links
 Youngstown State 1991 National Championship Season via YouTube
 Part 1 -- 25 years later: Tressel, YSU remembers 1991 championship via YouTube
 Part 2 -- 25 years later: Tressel, YSU remembers 1991 championship via YouTube

Championship Game
NCAA Division I Football Championship Games
Marshall Thundering Herd football games
Youngstown State Penguins football games
American football in Georgia (U.S. state)
Sports competitions in Georgia (U.S. state)
NCAA Division I-AA Football Championship Game
NCAA Division I-AA Football Championship Game